Camilo Reyes Rodríguez is a Colombian diplomat and the former Colombian Ambassador to the United States.

References

External links

 
Grand Crosses of the Order of the Sun of Peru
Year of birth missing (living people)
Living people